Robert Gilchrist Douglass (born June 22, 1947) is a former American football quarterback in the National Football League (NFL) who played most of his career with the Chicago Bears, who drafted him in the second round of the 1969 NFL Draft. During his career, he also played for the San Diego Chargers, the New Orleans Saints, and the Green Bay Packers. Douglass retired after the 1978 season, after playing 10 seasons in the NFL.

Douglass was raised in El Dorado, Kansas, where his father was a football coach and attended the University of Kansas. Douglass was a two-time All-Big Eight Conference (1967–68) selection and an All-American in 1968. During his senior season, he directed the Jayhawks to a 9–2 record, a share of the Big Eight Conference title and a spot in the 1969 Orange Bowl. He passed for 1,316 yards and 12 touchdowns during his final year as a Jayhawk and finished seventh in the Heisman Trophy voting that season.

In 1972, playing for the Bears, Douglass set the record for most rushing yards by a quarterback in one season. The record stood for 34 years. In a 14-game 1972 season, he ran for 968 yards and 8 touchdowns on 141 carries. Six quarterbacks (three in the CFL, three in the NFL) have since run for over 1,000 yards. With Douglass starting, the Chicago Bears had a 13–31–1 record.

In a November 4, 1973 game against the Packers, Douglass ran for four touchdowns in a 31–17 win. He and Billy Kilmer are the only quarterbacks in NFL history to rush for four touchdowns in a single game.

In five seasons from 1971 to 1975, Douglass played in 47 games and amassed 2,040 rushing yards. During that span, he averaged 43.4 rushing yards per game played—the third highest rushing yards per game average over a five-season span for a quarterback. (Michael Vick ranks first with 54.1 yards per game over a five-year span from 2002 to 2006). However, Douglass had little success as a passer, going 507-for-1178 for 36 touchdowns and 64 interceptions with a quarterback passer rating of only 48.5 during his 10-season NFL career.

After his professional football career was over, Douglass briefly played minor league baseball in the Chicago White Sox organization. In 1980, he pitched four games for the Iowa Oaks where he had 7 innings pitched, issued 13 walks and failed to record a strikeout.

Personal life
Douglass was married to former Playboy model Carol O'Neal. They had four children together and he became stepfather to her son.

Douglass was arrested on charges of trespassing on April 13, 2011.

References

1947 births
Living people
Sportspeople from Manhattan, Kansas
American football quarterbacks
Chicago Bears players
Green Bay Packers players
Iowa Oaks players
Kansas Jayhawks football players
New Orleans Saints players
Oakland Raiders players
San Diego Chargers players
Players of American football from Kansas
People from El Dorado, Kansas